is a former Japanese female singer.

Biography 
After Fujimura was born in Setagaya, Tokyo, her family relocated to Fukushima. While at a summer camp organized by School Mates (Sukuuru Meitsu), a Japanese idol, she met Ran Ito and Yoshiko Tanaka in 1969. The following year, Ito and Tanaka signed contracts with Watanabe Productions. Fujimura's parents were against her going into show business, but Ito and Tanaka were able to convince them to allow her to join them. The three of them then debuted with the showbiz training group "School Mates". The three girls eventually formed their own unit by the name of Candies.

Eventually, the trio caught the eye of songwriter Kōichi Morita. He wrote the song "Anata ni Muchū" (Crazy for You) to show the vocal power of the three girls. Fujimura was a strong lower alto harmony (to Tanaka's lead), and throughout Candies' five-year career, she was a supporting vocalist (to Ito's lead) on singles.

In July 1977, during a live performance, the trio made a surprise announcement that "[they] want[ed] to return to being normal girls" and immediately end their careers. After a press conference to calm down the masses, they announced the formal disbandment date during the following April. Thus, in December 1977, Fujimura was finally given the lead vocalist position on the single "Wana" (Trap). The single reached No. 2 on the Oricon charts, and was their highest-charting single until the following year, when they released their penultimate single "Hohoemi Gaeshi" (Return of a Smile) which charted at No. 1.

Candies broke up in April 1978 at a massive day-to-night concert. The group sang a total of 51 songs, and Fujimura finally was able to show her vocal prowess by leading many cover songs, including the song "For Freedom", which was the namesake of the concert.

After the group's breakup, Fujimura restarted as a solo pop singer in 1983. Her only single "Yume-Koi-Bito" (Dream Lover) reached No. 13 on the Oricon charts and sold over 160,000 copies. The single was used as an image song for Kanebo cosmetics, which made the song even more popular.

In April 1983, Fujimura married Yoshikazu Omi, a salaryman from Tokyo, with a televised reception and a final performance of her single. In the press conference after the reception, she withdrew from the music business to focus on her married life. Unlike her former Candies groupmates, she now goes by her married name, and never returned to show business.

In 1984, she gave birth to her first child, Minori Omi, currently a stage actress for the Seinenza Theater Company. Two years later, Fujimara gave birth to her second daughter, Minae Omi. In 1988, she gave birth to her only son, Zensuke Omi, an accomplished filmmaker based in New Orleans, Louisiana, USA.

In 2008, there were plans for a Candies reunion tour to celebrate 35 years since their debut and 30 years since their epic farewell concert. Fujimura refused to take part in the concert for the sake of her family. The tour never came about, but the trio contributed pictures and essays to release a commemoration "Time Capsule" best-of album instead.

In April 2011, after the death of Tanaka, Fujimura made her first public appearance at her funeral ceremony and along with Ito, delivered the eulogy.

Discography

Albums

Singles

Appearances

Television 
 1983, Tetsuko no Heya (Tetsuko's Room) – Talk Show

See also 
 Yoshiko Tanaka, (a member of Candies)
 Ran Ito, (a member of Candies)

References

Japanese women singers
Japanese idols
1956 births
Living people
Musicians from Fukushima Prefecture
Musicians from Setagaya